2012–13 Belarusian Cup was the twenty second season of the Belarusian annual cup competition. Contrary to the league season, it is conducted in a fall-spring rhythm. The first games were played on 13 June 2012. Winners of the Cup qualified for the second qualifying round of the 2013–14 UEFA Europa League.

Participating clubs 
The following teams will take part in the competition:

First round
32 teams started the competition in this round: 10 teams from the First League, 16 teams from Second League and 6 amateur clubs. 5 First League clubs that were at the top of league table at the moment of the draw (SKVICH Minsk, Bereza-2010, Gorodeya, Dnepr Mogilev and Granit Mikashevichi) and all 11 Premier League teams received a bye to the next round. Matches of this round will be played on 13 June 2012.

Round of 32 
The winners from the First Round will play against 16 clubs that received a bye to this round. The draw was conducted on 14 June 2012.

Round of 16
The draw was conducted on 10 September 2012. The games are scheduled for 26 September 2012.

Quarterfinals
An open draw for quarterfinals was conducted on 22 November 2012. The matches will be played on 16 and 17 March 2013.

Semifinals
An open draw for semifinals was conducted on 18 March 2013. The matches were played on 3 April 2013.

Final

See also
 2012 Belarusian Premier League
 2013 Belarusian Premier League
 2012 Belarusian First League

References

External links
 Football.by

2012–13 domestic association football cups
Cup
Cup
2012-13